Einaras Tubutis (born 4 November 1998) is a Lithuanian professional basketball player for the Skyliners Frankfurt of the Basketball Bundesliga. Standing 2.07 m (6 ft 9 in), he plays the power forward position. Tubutis has competed with the Lithuanian junior national teams on multiple occasions.

Professional career
Tubutis made his professional career debut with Vilnius Citus/VKC team in RKL. After two season with Vilnius team, he signed with BC Perlas. Soon becoming one of the leaders, Tubutis was spotted by BC Rytas.

On August 26, 2021, he has signed with ZZ Leiden of the Dutch Basketball League (DBL). Tubutis helped Leiden win the inaugural BNXT championship.

In July 2022, Tubutis signed with the German team Skyliners Frankfurt of the Basketball Bundesliga.

References

External links
 Einaras Tubutis at Eurobasket.com

1998 births
Living people
Basketball players from Vilnius
BC Prienai players
BC Rytas players
Skyliners Frankfurt players
ZZ Leiden players